Rubus arizonensis, called Arizona dewberry, is a North American species of dewberry in section Procumbentes of the genus Rubus, a member of the rose family. It is endemic to Arizona and Sonora, Mexico.

References

External links
photo of herbarium specimen at Missouri Botanical Garden, collected in Arizona in 1881

arizonensis
Flora of Arizona
Flora of New Mexico
Flora of Sonora
Flora of Texas
Plants described in 1914